"A Perfect Match" was A-Teens' second single from their third album New Arrival. The track was written by Mack, Habolin and Jasson and became one of the band's biggest hits in Sweden and Latin-America. The song reached number-two in Sweden and Mexico, it also reached number-five in Argentina despite the album New Arrival was never released there and also hit number-eleven in Chile and number-seventy on the Official Euro chart. Because of the delays in Germany both the single and album flopped in the country, reaching a disappointing number seventy-seven on the Singles Chart.

Music video
The video was filmed in Cuba, and was co-directed by the A-Teens themselves. It tells a story of a rich girl and a poor boy who fall in love with each other, but their families are against their relationship; however, despite this, and their differences, they are still "a perfect match". It was a hit in both Sweden and Mexico and despite the album was never released in Argentina, the video reached number-one on MTV's "Los 10 + Pedidos". The video was out of the request charts 2003 as the 34th most played video of MTV Mexico, and the 45th on MTV South America.  It has 690,000 views on YouTube as of 28, November 2009.

Cover songs and renditions 
An additional version of the song, in which the references to "South Park" and "Snatch" had been changed to "Star Wars" and "Flash", was played on Radio Disney, to make it more child-friendly.
The music was used with new lyrics in J-Pop singer Nami Tamaki's 2004 single "Daitan ni Ikimashou – Heart & Soul"

Releases
Swedish CD single
A Perfect Match [Single Mix] - 3:00
A Perfect Match [Extended Mix] - 4:15
Slam - 3:04

European 2-track single
A Perfect Match [Single Mix] - 3:00
A Perfect Match [Extended Mix] - 4:15

International CD Maxi
A Perfect Match [Single Mix] - 3:00
A Perfect Match [Extended Mix] - 4:15
A Perfect Match [Tranceglobal Club Mix] - 5:33
Singled Out - 4:13

Weekly charts

References 

A-Teens songs
2003 singles
2002 songs
Universal Music Group singles